Jurva is a former municipality of Finland. It was consolidated to Kurikka on 1 January 2009.

It is located in the province of Western Finland and is part of the Southern Ostrobothnia region. The municipality had a population of 4,611 (2003) and covered an area of 447.18 km² of which 3.11 km² is water. The population density was 10.3 inhabitants per km².

The municipality was unilingually Finnish.

External links 

 Jurva villages cite

Populated places disestablished in 2009
2009 disestablishments in Finland
Former municipalities of Finland
Jurva